The 2013 Castilla y León Cup (Spanish: Copa Castilla y León 2013) is the fifth edition of this football trophy in its renewed version.

Teams participants

Competition format
Valladolid, as La Liga team, and Mirandés as defending champion are directly qualified to semifinals. The other 12 teams are divided into four groups of three teams, where the top teams will qualify to the knockout stage.

Every team will play two matches in the group stage and until the final, every match will be played in the field of the team of lower category.

Group stage

Group A 

Games played
2013–07–28 La Granja 0–0 Guijuelo (3–1 p.s.o.)
Games of UD Salamanca were not played. Finally La Granja qualified to the knockout stage as group A winner.

Group B 

Games played
2013–07–28 Atlético Bembibre 0–2 Ponferradina
2013–07–31 Atlético Astorga 0–2 Ponferradina
2013–08–03 Atlético Astorga 2–0 Atlético Bembibre

Group C 

Games played
2013–07–27 Burgos 0–4 Numancia
2013–07–31 Arandina 0–5 Numancia
2013–08–03 Burgos 3–1 Arandina

Group D 

Games played
2013–07–27 La Virgen del Camino 1–2 Cultural Leonesa
2013–07–31 Zamora 3–0 La Virgen del Camino
2013–08–03 Cultural Leonesa 2–3 Zamora

Knockout stage

References

See also
Castilla y León Cup
2012 Castilla y León Cup

2013
2013–14 in Spanish football cups